Margaret Mary Murray (née O'Keeffe; 9 September 1961 – 13 June 2020) was an Irish Fianna Fáil politician, a councillor on Fingal County Council for the Castleknock Local Electoral Area and the mayor of Fingal County Council.

Biography 
Born in Cregane, Charleville, Co Cork, she played camogie with the local camogie team, Ballyagran. Murray won an All-Ireland Senior Club Camogie Championship with her club in 1978, playing in the position of right wing forward.  Upon moving to Dublin, Mags Murray joined St Brigids GAA Club as a camogie player and also as a mentor.

Murray was first elected at the 2004 elections as a member of the Progressive Democrats. She was subsequently an unsuccessful candidate for the party in the 2007 Irish general election in Dublin West. As the Progressive Democrats became defunct she joined Fianna Fáil in February 2008. Mags Murray was elected in the local elections in 2009, and retained her seat again in the 2014 local elections.  

In June 2014, Councillor Mags Murray was elected as the new Mayor of Fingal. A Fianna Fáil, Fine Gael and Labour Alliance, backed by a number of Independents, ensured the election of the Castleknock-based Councillor, who had been sitting on Fingal County Council for a decade. She defeated three other nominees, Sinn Féin's Paul Donnelly, Sandra Kavanagh from the Anti Austerity Alliance and Non-Party Councillor Lorna Nolan. Cllr Murray received 21 votes, with Cllr Donnelly getting 6, Cllr Nolan receiving 8, and Cllr Kavanagh getting 3.

County Mayor Cllr Mags Murray hosted the 2015 Annual Mayors' Conference, entitled Immigration to Integration, which focused on the positive impact of immigration and challenges of integration on both the receiving communities and the immigrants.

In February 2015, the Mayor of Fingal had described how a group of anti-water charge protesters blocked her exit from a council meeting for more than an hour, preventing her from getting to the hospital to see her sick daughter who was awaiting a liver transplant.

Mags Murray said that she had to suffer verbal abuse as well as being blocked into the council's car park late on Monday night.

Murray served as the first female president of LAMA (Local Authority Members Association) for five years, from 2014 – 2019. Noted from her LAMA colleagues “Mags was an excellent Councillor. She served on Fingal County Council for fifteen years, from 2004 – 2019. Mags lit up every room she entered. She was a hard worker, a caring politician and a loving mother.".

References

External links
Electoral history
Cathaoirleach blocked in by Anti-Watercharge protesters
LAMA website

1961 births
2020 deaths
Fianna Fáil politicians
Local councillors in Fingal
Place of birth missing
Place of death missing
Irish women in politics